The City of Los Angeles Department of Cultural Affairs is the official Los Angeles, California, USA arts council.

The agency approves the design of structures built on or over City property and accepts works of art to be acquired by the City. The Commission meets on the first and third Friday mornings of each month.

The Department runs under the county arts council, the LA County Arts Commission and the California state arts council, the California Arts Council (CAC).

External links
City of Los Angeles Department of Cultural Affairs

Arts councils of California
Culture of Los Angeles
Organizations based in Los Angeles